Rafer is a given name which may refer to:

Rafer Alston (born 1976), basketball player
Rafer Johnson (1935–2020), American actor and former decathlete
Rafer Joseph (born 1968), athlete
Rafer Mohammed (born 1955), athlete
Rafer Weigel (born 1969), news anchor

See also 
 Rafe (name)